Davit Aghmashenebeli may refer to:

 David IV of Georgia, a King of Georgia from 1089 to 1125
 Davit Aghmashenebeli Avenue, a street in Tbilisi